Geoffrey Rashid Arend (born February 28, 1978) is an American film, television, voice and theater actor. He is best known for his role as Ethan Gross on the ABC drama series Body of Proof, Matt Mahoney on the CBS political drama series Madam Secretary, and a young stoner in Super Troopers.

Biography
Arend was born in the Manhattan borough of New York City to Geoffrey D. Arend Sr. and Sabiha Khan Arend. His father is American and of German and English descent, whereas his mother is Pakistani. He graduated from New York City's Fiorello H. LaGuardia High School of Music & Art and Performing Arts in 1996.

Career
In 1998, Arend joined the cast of Daria as the voice artist for obnoxious flirt Charles "Upchuck" Ruttheimer III. He would voice Upchuck until the end of the series in 2002, as well as in the video game Daria's Inferno. After the show finished, Arend landed small roles in films such as Super Troopers, where he played a stoner who eats an entire bag of mushrooms to avoid getting caught by the cops after his friend gets pulled over, and Bubble Boy. He played a man with an intellectual disability in the film The Ringer, and then had a supporting role in the romantic comedy (500) Days of Summer.

Arend previously appeared in the medical drama television series Body of Proof, which aired on ABC from March 29, 2011 to May 28, 2013 and played speech writer Matt Mahoney on the CBS drama Madam Secretary.

Arend joined the cast as a series regular in the fourth and final season of the Amazon Prime Video drama television series Goliath, aired fall of 2021.

Personal life
On October 11, 2009, he married actress Christina Hendricks. It was announced in October 2019 that they had separated, with a divorce finalized in December of that year.

Filmography

Film

Television

Video games

References

External links
 

1979 births
Living people
Male actors from New York City
American male film actors
American male television actors
American male stage actors
American people of English descent
American people of German descent
American people of Pakistani descent
People from Manhattan
American male video game actors
American male voice actors
20th-century American male actors
21st-century American male actors
Fiorello H. LaGuardia High School alumni